Sharif Abu Tayeb Daoud bin Abdul Rahman bin Abi Al-Fatik Abdullah bin Dawood bin Suleiman who took command of Mecca in 1012 AD was the first Banu Hashim to rule Mecca. He continued to lead the city through 1039. He founded the Mikhlaf al-Sulaymani, and ruled the surrounding areas. He yielded the rule of Hijaz to his brother Sharif Mohammed bin Abdul Rahman bin Abi Al-Fatak. His descendants today are Al-Fakher, Abu Omreen, Al-Mahdi and Al-Hamzah.

Descendants 

 Abu Tayeb Daoud bin Abdul Rahman bin Abi Al-Fatik
 Abdullah bin Dawood bin Suleiman bin Abdullah
 Al-Reza bin Musa bin Abdullah Al-Kamil bin Al-Hassan
 Muthanna bin Hassan Al-Sabt bin Ali ibn Abi Talib.

Ruling on Mecca and Hijaz 
Sharif Abu Tayeb Dawood bin Abdul Rahman took the command of Mecca in 1012. This was the first of the rule of the al'ashraf alsulimaniuwn of Bani Hashim, which ruled Mecca and Hijaz in 1012 AD. He continued to lead into 1039 and was then succeeded by his brother, Sharif Mohammed bin Abdul Rahman ibn Abi al-Fatik.

References

Arab kings
11th-century Arabs
1041 deaths
Sunni Islam
Banu Hashim
History of Mecca
 
Alid dynasties
Hashemite people